Elias Kuukka (born 12 February 1994) is a Finnish orienteering competitor, born in Tampere. He competed at the 2019 World Orienteering Championships in Østfold, where placed 14th in the long distance, and won a silver medal with the Finnish relay team, along with Aleksi Niemi and Miika Kirmula.

References

 

1994 births
Living people
Finnish orienteers
Male orienteers
Foot orienteers
Competitors at the 2017 World Games
World Orienteering Championships medalists
Sportspeople from Tampere